Three Texas Steers (UK title Danger Rides the Range) is a 1939 American "Three Mesquiteers" Western B-movie directed by George Sherman. It stars John Wayne, Ray "Crash" Corrigan  and Max Terhune as the Mesquiteers; with Carole Landis as the female lead. Wayne played the lead in eight of the fifty-one films in the series.

Plot summary

Cast
 John Wayne as Stony Brooke
 Ray "Crash" Corrigan as Tucson Smith
 Max Terhune as Lullaby Joslin
 Carole Landis as Nancy Evans
 Ralph Graves as George Ward
 Roscoe Ates as Sheriff Brown
 Collette Lyons as Lillian
 Billy Curtis as Hercules, the Midget
 Ted Adams as Henchman Steve
 Stanley Blystone as Henchman Rankin
 David Sharpe as Tony
 Ethan Laidlaw as Henchman Morgan
 Lew Kelly as Postman

See also
 John Wayne filmography

References

External links
 
 
 
 

1939 films
1939 Western (genre) films
American Western (genre) films
American black-and-white films
1930s English-language films
Films directed by George Sherman
Films scored by William Lava
Republic Pictures films
Three Mesquiteers films
1930s American films